Knipholone is a chemical compound found in the roots of Kniphofia foliosa of the family Asphodelaceae.

References 

Dihydroxyanthraquinones
Phenol ethers